David Ruíz (23 July 1912 – 11 January 1994) was a Chilean footballer. He played in two matches for the Chile national football team in 1941. He was also part of Chile's squad for the 1941 South American Championship.

References

External links
 

1912 births
1994 deaths
Chilean footballers
Chile international footballers
Place of birth missing
Association football forwards
Audax Italiano footballers